Ro-53, originally named Submarine No. 27, was an Imperial Japanese Navy Type L submarine, the lead unit of the L2 subclass. She was in commission from 1921 to 1938.

Design and description
The submarines of the Type L2 sub-class were close copies of the British L-class submarine built under license in Japan. They differed from the preceding L1 subclass in the deletion of the two broadside-firing torpedo tubes and the two torpedoes for them, the use of domestically produced diesel engines and batteries, and a different battery arrangement. They displaced  surfaced and  submerged.

For surface running, the submarines were powered by two  Vickers diesel engines, each driving one propeller shaft. When submerged, each propeller was driven by an  electric motor. They could reach  on the surface and  underwater.

The submarines were armed with four internal  torpedo tubes, all in the bow, and carried a total of eight Type 44 torpedoes. They were also armed with a single  deck gun.

Construction and commissioning

Ro-53 was laid down as Submarine No. 27 on 1 April 1919 by Mitsubishi at Kobe, Japan. Launched on 6 July 1920, she was completed and commissioned on 10 March 1921.

Service history

Upon commissioning, Submarine No. 27 was assigned to Submarine Division 3 in Submarine Squadron 1 in the 1st Fleet. Submarine Division 3 was attached to the Yokosuka Naval District on 1 December 1921 and was assigned that day to the Yokosuka Defense Division, then was reassigned on 1 June 1922 to the Ominato Defense Division.

On 1 December 1922, Submarine No. 27 was attached to the Kure Naval District and reassigned to Submarine Division 11, in both of which she remained for the rest of her active career. During the years that followed, Submarine No. 25 was assigned to the Kure Defense Division from 1 December 1922 to 1 December 1923 and was renamed Ro-53 on 1 November 1924. She had additional Kure Defense Division assignments from 1 December 1926 to 10 December 1928, from 30 November 1929 to 15 October 1931, and from 1 December 1932 to 8 October 1935.

Ro-53 was anchored at Takamatsu, Japan, on 21 April 1925 when a cargo ferry under tow by the Japanese Government Railways steamer  collided with her. From 27 March to 10 May 1935, Ro-53 and the protected cruiser  took part in the Hiroshima Prefecture National Defense and Industrial Great Exhibition at Kure, Japan, and were open to public tours. On 9 April 1938 she and her division mate  got underway from Sasebo, Japan, for a training cruise in southern Chinese waters, which they concluded with their arrival at Kīrun, Formosa, on 14 April 1938.

Ro-53 was decommissioned and placed in the Fourth Reserve in the Kure Naval District on 15 December 1938. The Japanese struck her from the Navy list on 1 April 1940, and that day she became a stationary hulk with the name Haisen No. 11.

Notes

Bibliography
, History of Pacific War Extra, "Perfect guide, The submarines of the Imperial Japanese Forces", Gakken (Japan), March 2005, 
The Maru Special, Japanese Naval Vessels No.43 Japanese Submarines III, Ushio Shobō (Japan), September 1980, Book code 68343-44
The Maru Special, Japanese Naval Vessels No.132 Japanese Submarines I "Revised edition", Ushio Shobō (Japan), February 1988, Book code 68344-36
The Maru Special, Japanese Naval Vessels No.133 Japanese Submarines II "Revised edition", Ushio Shobō (Japan), March 1988, Book code 68344-37

Ro-53-class submarines
Japanese L type submarines
Ships built by Mitsubishi Heavy Industries
1920 ships
Maritime incidents in 1925